The 1990 All-Atlantic Coast Conference football team consists of American football players chosen by various selectors for their All-Atlantic Coast Conference ("ACC") teams for the 1990 NCAA Division I-A football season. Selectors in 1990 included the Associated Press (AP).

Clemson led with seven players being named to the first team. Virginia followed with six first-team selections.  The top three vote recipients all played for Virginia's offense: quarterback Shawn Moore and wide receiver Herman Moore, each with 164 points, and running back Terry Kirby with 162 points. Shawn Moore also received the award as the ACC's most valuable player of the 1990 season. Georgia Tech won the ACC championship, finished the season ranked No. 2 in the final AP Poll, and placed five players on the first team.

Offensive selections

Wide receivers
 Herman Moore, Virginia (AP-1) [164]
 Barry Johnson, Maryland (AP-1) [112]

Tight ends
 John Henry Mills, Wake Forest (AP-1) [89]

Offensive tackles
 Stacy Long, Clemson (AP-1) [129]
 Ray Roberts, Virginia (AP-1) [112]

Offensive guards
 Joe Siffri, Georgia Tech (AP-1) [145]
 Eric Harmon, Clemson (AP-1) [131]

Centers
 Trevor Ryals, Virginia (AP-1) [123]

Quarterbacks
 Shawn Moore, Virginia (AP-1) [164]

Running backs
 Terry Kirby, Virginia (AP-1) [162]
 Ronald Williams, Clemson (AP-1) [133]

Defensive selections

Defensive linemen
 Vance Hammond, Clemson (AP-1) [135]
 Chris Slade, Virginia (AP-1) [112]
 Rob Bodine, Clemson (AP-1) [83]

Linebackers
 Calvin Tiggle, Georgia Tech (AP-1 [ILB}) [106]
 Dwight Hollier, North Carolina (AP-1 [ILB]) [103]
 Marco Coleman, Georgia Tech (AP-1 [OLB]) [146]
 Levon Kirkland, Clemson (AP-1 [OLB]) [131]

Defensive backs
 Ken Swilling, Georgia Tech (AP-1) [143]
 Dexter Davis, Clemson (AP-1) [138]
 Jesse Campbell, NC State (AP-1) [131]
 Willie Clay, Georgia Tech (AP-1) [86]

Special teams

Placekickers
 Chris Gardocki, Clemson (AP-1) [143]

Punters
 Chris Gardocki, Clemson (AP-1) [121]

Key
AP = Associated Press selected by members of the Atlantic Coast Sports Writers Association (point totals in brackets: two points for a first-team selection, one point for a second-team selection)

References

All-Atlantic Coast Conference football team
All-Atlantic Coast Conference football teams